Imani Entertainment Group is an American entertainment company founded and owned by Manny Halley. The company has offices in Atlanta and Los Angeles.

History
Founded by Manny Halley in 2005, Imani Entertainment Group is a full-service entertainment company, inclusive of artist management, music publishing, film production, television and an independent record label. Affiliate company Faith Media Distribution is a film distributor.

Management

Wheezy (record producer)
Iyana Halley
London on da Track
Manny World

External links
 Official website
 Imani Ent. on Twitter

References

Talent agencies
Universal Music Group
American companies established in 2005
Entertainment companies established in 2005